Lissodynerus is an Indomalayan and Australasian genus of potter wasps. The following species are classified under Lissodynerus:

 Lissodynerus agilis (Smith, 1858)
 Lissodynerus ater Giordani Soika, 1995
 Lissodynerus celebensis Selis, 2017
 Lissodynerus desaussurei Borsato, 2003
 Lissodynerus duplofasciatus (Schulthess, 1934)
 Lissodynerus impulsus (Smith, 1865)
 Lissodynerus kurandensis Giordani Soika, 1995
 Lissodynerus laminiger (Gribodo, 1891)
 Lissodynerus nigripennis Giordani Soika, 1993
 Lissodynerus niveatus Giordani Soika, 1994
 Lissodynerus pallidus Giordani Soika, 1995
 Lissodynerus philippinensis (Schulthess, 1913)
 Lissodynerus rutlandicus Kumar, Srinivasan & Carpenter, 2015
 Lissodynerus septemfasciatus (Smith, 1858)
 Lissodynerus simillimus Giordani Soika, 1995
 Lissodynerus Solomon Giordani Soika, 1995
 Lissodynerus trilaminatus Giordani Soika, 1995
 Lissodynerus vespoides (Williams, 1919)
 Lissodynerus wilhelmi Giordani Soika, 1996

References

Biological pest control wasps
Potter wasps